Dock Mennonite Academy, formerly known as Christopher Dock Mennonite High School and Penn View Christian School is a private school in Montgomery County that is affiliated with Mosaic Mennonite Conference. The school was named after schoolmaster Christopher Dock of Skippack, Pennsylvania.  The school's stated mission is to "inspire and equip each student to serve with a global perspective by integrating faith, academic excellence, and life-enriching opportunities in a Christ-centered community" . The school has two campuses and serves students in early childhood to grade twelve.

Timeline

October 2, 1952 - Constitution of the proposed school approved and a Board of Trustees selected.  Paul R. Clemens appointed as Board President.

December 8, 1952 - Richard Detweiler was chosen as administrator for the proposed school.

January 1, 1953 -  of the Johnston farm on Forty Foot Road approved as school site and purchased for $57,570.

December 14, 1953 - H.M. Minniger given the contract to make the "two barns" into classrooms, auditorium, and gymnasium.

January 11, 1954 - Edgar Clemens appointed as the first member of the faculty.

June 12, 1954 - $315 appropriated for starting a library.

August 2, 1954 - Reconstructed building named Grebel Hall.

September 15, 1954 - 115 students attend the first day of classes.

December 19, 1954 - Dedication service for the new school.

November 16, 1955 -  School officially recognized by the Pennsylvania Department of Education.

September/October 1958 - Construction of pond and landscaping front of campus.

March 12, 1962 - "Knowledge With Reverence" made the official school motto.

June 1963 - Harvey Bauman assumes the responsibilities of principal as Richard Detweiler begins the part-time role of superintendent.

December 8, 1963 - Dedication of the new multi-purpose building (named Clemens Center)

June 1965 - T. Carroll Moyer assumes responsibilities of principal as Richard Detweiler continues in a part-time role of superintendent.

June 11, 1966 - Lee M. Yoder inaugurated as superintendent.

January 8, 1971 - Accreditation by the Middle States Association of Colleges and Secondary Schools.

October 9–17, 1971 - Bicentennial Celebrations commemorating the man, Christopher Dock.

February 11, 1975 - Paul J. Miller named principal after serving as Acting Principal for one year.

October 29, 1978 - Dedication of new classroom building named Dielman Hall and music annex in Clemens Center.

April 19–22, 1979 - Twenty-Fifth Anniversary Celebration

June 1, 1979 - Elam J. Peachey named Principal.

1980-1981 - Student enrollment reaches an all-time high of 421.

October 18, 1986 - Dedication of new kitchen facilities in Clemens Center.

June 10, 1990 - Food services director Emma Landis retires after 35 years of service.

July 1, 1990 - Elaine A. Moyer named principal after serving as acting principal for one year.

October 17, 1992 - Administration building named Detweiler House in honor of Richard Detweiler.

October 15, 1994 - Fortieth Anniversary Celebration, "Festival on Forty Foot".

February 2, 1997 - Dedication of Longacre Center, a multi-purpose activity center with double gymnasium, theater, fitness center, and classrooms.

September 12, 2000 - CD Board adopts a Long Range Plan for the next eight years.

October 12, 2002 - Dedication of Dock Stadium and three new classrooms in Clemens Center.  Men's soccer wins their first State Title (Single A).

June 2003 - Mr Kauffman retires from teaching after 45 years at Dock.

July 9–11, 2004 - 50th Anniversary Celebration.

June 2005 - Baseball team wins its first state championship.

July 2005 - Grebel Hall Demolished to make way for $12,000,000 Capital Improvement Campaign

August 2005 - New Art Center and Caretaker Cottage Opens

June 2006 - Baseball team wins second consecutive state title.

August 2006 - New Academic Center opens - named "Rosenberger Academic Center"

December 2006 - Refurbished Dielman Hall opens.

March 2007 - Beloved FACS teacher Jeanine Musselman passes away from brain cancer.

January 2009 - Principal Elaine Moyer announces she has accepted the position of Associate Director of Mennonite Education Agency, and will be concluding her service at the end of the school year.
May 2009 - soccer team wins their 4th state championship
August 2009 - Dr. Swartzentruber is named the new school Principal and begins his new post

June 2010 - Baseball team wins its third state championship in six seasons.

References

External links
Official website

Mennonite schools in the United States
Mennonitism in Pennsylvania
Private high schools in Pennsylvania
Educational institutions established in 1954
Schools in Montgomery County, Pennsylvania
1954 establishments in Pennsylvania
Christian schools in Pennsylvania